List of largest armed forces can refer to:
List of countries by number of military and paramilitary personnel
List of countries by military expenditures
List of countries by level of military equipment
List of countries by Military Strength Index